The 2012–13 Kategoria e Parë was competed between 16 teams started on 31 August 2012 and finished on 12 May 2013.

Changes from last season

Team changes

From Kategoria e Parë
Promoted to Kategoria Superiore:
 Luftëtari
 Kukësi
 Besa

Relegated to Kategoria e Dytë:
 Gramozi
 Vlora
 Skrapari

To Kategoria e Parë
Relegated from Kategoria Superiore:
 Kamza
 Pogradeci
 Dinamo Tirana

Promoted from Kategoria e Dytë:
 Tërbuni
 Partizani
 Naftëtari

League table

Top scorers

References

Kategoria e Parë seasons
2
Alba